Émile Flach was the first Minister of State for Monaco. He served between 1911 and 1917. He was born in 1853 and died in 1926 at the age of 72.

References

Ministers of State of Monaco
1853 births
1926 deaths